S61 may refer to:

Naval vessels 
 , of the Royal Australian Navy
 , of the Indian Navy

Rail and transit 
 S61 (Long Island bus)
 S61 (New York City bus) serving Staten Island
 S61, a line of the Styria S-Bahn

Other uses 
 Blériot-SPAD S.61, a French fighter aircraft
 Chopi language
 County Route S61 (Bergen County, New Jersey)
 Expressway S61 (Poland)
 S61: Avoid release to the environment. Refer to special instructions/safety data sheet, a safety phrase
 Sikorsky S-61, an American helicopter
 S61, a postcode district in Rotherham, England